In algebra, the Kantor–Koecher–Tits construction is a method of constructing a Lie algebra from a Jordan algebra, introduced by , , and .

If J is a Jordan algebra, the Kantor–Koecher–Tits construction puts a Lie algebra structure on J + J + Inner(J), the sum of 2 copies of J and the Lie algebra of inner derivations of J.

When applied to a 27-dimensional exceptional Jordan algebra it gives a Lie algebra of type E7 of dimension 133.

References

Lie algebras
Non-associative algebras